Daniel James Naisbitt (born 21 November 1978) is an English football goalkeeper.

Career
Born in Bishop Auckland, Naisbitt began his career as a trainee with Middlesbrough, joining Walsall turning professional in 1997, but failed to make the Walsall first team and moved to Barnet in 1999. He had a loan spell with Carlisle United in August 2002 and was released by Barnet in September 2003.

He joined Harlow Town, joining Brentford on non-contract forms as cover for Paul Smith in November 2003. Later the same month he joined Cambridge City and played one match for Hendon in March 2004. In June 2004 Naisbitt joined AFC Wimbledon, leaving to rejoin Cambridge City in October 2005. He left to join Histon in May 2007, making his competitive debut on 20 September 2007, in a televised game against Oxford United. In 2007 for Histon he kept 3 clean sheets and conceded 27 goals in 19 games, but despite that he kept his place over Marc Osborn in goal.

In March 2010, Naisbitt joined League One Brighton & Hove Albion, on loan until the end of the 2009–10 season. On the season's conclusion he signed for Histon's near neighbours Cambridge United. Naisbitt left Cambridge United on 15 May 2012 after the two parties failed to agree a new deal.

In August 2012, he signed for Conference National side Braintree Town.

References

External links

1978 births
Sportspeople from Bishop Auckland
Footballers from County Durham
English footballers
Living people
Walsall F.C. players
Barnet F.C. players
Carlisle United F.C. players
Harlow Town F.C. players
Brentford F.C. players
Cambridge City F.C. players
Dagenham & Redbridge F.C. players
AFC Wimbledon players
Lewes F.C. players
Histon F.C. players
Brighton & Hove Albion F.C. players
Cambridge United F.C. players
Braintree Town F.C. players
English Football League players
National League (English football) players
Association football goalkeepers
Hendon F.C. players
Isthmian League players